is a powder foundation traditionally used by kabuki actors, geisha and their apprentices. The word  literally means "white powder", and is pronounced as the word for white with the honorific prefix .

Description
 is traditionally applied over a base of two types of wax used as a primer:  is applied to the eyebrows, whereas  (facial wax) is applied to cover the rest of the face and the neck.

The  is mixed with water before being applied with a wide, flat brush over the neck, face and back. The  must be mixed carefully with water to achieve the right consistency, and can be difficult to achieve, as  that has too much moisture will not apply smoothly to the face, and  that has too little will crack and potentially fall off when worn.

 is painted straight over the eyebrows, with the  providing a smooth surface over the eyebrows to be painted over. The face is then powdered with rice powder, before the details around the eyes, eyebrows and mouth are drawn in.

Application

Geisha and 

Both geisha and  wear  on the face and neck, but application on the back of the neck differs per occasion.

 can be painted freehand with a smaller brush, but  is generally painted using a stencil.

Since the application of  can prove challenging, a younger  may have her  ("mother" – typically the mother of the geisha house) or her "older sister" geisha mentor apply it for her at first.

Younger apprentices may, in some regions, wear only  and blusher at the beginning of their apprenticeship to mark their inexperience, with the addition of black and red eyeliner at a later stage. Likewise, senior geisha tend not to wear any blusher, and wear  on fewer occasions over time, eventually wearing it only for special occasions and stage performances.

Makeup styles may also vary in their use of blusher, red eyeliner and black eyeliner; this typically depends on both the inclinations of the mother of the house, and the general style of the geisha district.

Kabuki

History
In the past, the type of  used contained white lead, and would eventually give the wearer lead poisoning. The use of white lead in makeup was outlawed in Japan in 1934.

See also

References

Cosmetics
Cultural history of Japan
Japanese fashion
Japanese words and phrases